Méduse was a  of the French Navy. She was launched on 26 August 1930 at Le Havre, France.

After France surrendered to Germany in June 1940 during World War II, Méduse served with the navy of Vichy France. During Operation Torch, the Allied invasion of French North Africa, she was wrecked on 10 November 1942 when she beached herself on the French North African coast to avoid sinking after suffering damage in an attack in the Atlantic Ocean off Cape Blanc by United States Navy floatplanes based on the light cruiser .

References 

1930 ships
Ships built in France
World War II submarines of France
Submarines sunk by aircraft
Maritime incidents in November 1942
World War II shipwrecks in the Atlantic Ocean
Ships sunk by US aircraft
Diane-class submarine (1930)